This is a complete list of Sweden national football team managers, football managers who have coached the Sweden national football team and a list of the chairmen of the Swedish Football Association International Selection Committee from 1908 to 1961 which acted as national team managers. They are listed in chronological order, their total national team scores and any qualifications to the finals of the World Cup, European Championship or Olympic Games are included. A game lost after a penalty shoot-out is counted as a draw, but a game lost after extra time is counted as a loss.

List of national team managers
Updated 12 January 2023.

List of chairmen of the Swedish Football Association International Selection Committee

References 
 Alsiö, Martin, Frantz, Alf, Lindahl, Jimmy & Persson, Gunnar (2004). 100 år: Svenska fotbollförbundets jubileumsbok 1904–2004, del 2: statistiken. Vällingby: Stroemberg Media Group. .
 Swedish Football Association (2006). Landslaget. Retrieved 13 October 2006.

 
Sweden
national managers
National football team managers